WCBZ-CD, virtual channel 22 (UHF digital channel 18), is a low-powered, Class A Cozi TV-affiliated television station licensed to Columbus, Ohio, United States. The station is owned by the Columbus Broadcasting Corporation.

History
WCBZ-CD was founded as W22AE on April 17, 1989. The station then changed its call letters to WBKA-LP in 1995. In 2004, the station was acquired from low-power broadcaster, Crawford Broadcasting by Metro Video Productions, and was granted Class A status, thus changing its callsign to WBKA-CA.

In 2008, the station was acquired by Studio 51 Multimedia Productions, Ltd., and began operating as TV 22 Marion, offering comprehensive coverage of the events in the Marion County, Ohio area, as well as other original programming. In August 2009, the WBKA-CA call sign was changed to WMNO-CA (MarioN-Ohio).

In 2015, the station was purchased by Positive News Network, Inc. at which point it took on its current network affiliation.

In 2017, the call sign changed again to WCBZ-CD (Columbus Broadcasting) to better reflect its new ownership by Columbus Broadcasting Corporation.

In Marion, WCBZ-CD had been carried on Time Warner Cable (Now Charter Spectrum) channel 3 (with cable box) or channel 96 (without cable box), but the station was removed from the Marion channel line-up on May 8, 2018.

Digital channels
The station's digital signal is multiplexed:

Analog-to-digital conversion
WMNO-CD shut down its analog signal, over UHF channel 22, on January 7, 2015, and "flash-cut" its digital signal into operation to UHF channel 28, using PSIP to display WMNO-CD's virtual channel as 22 on digital television receivers.

References

External links
 
 Your TV22
 RabbitEars
 Grit TV
 Escape

Cozi TV affiliates
Grit (TV network) affiliates
Ion Mystery affiliates
GetTV affiliates
Local AccuWeather Channel affiliates
CBZ-CD
Television channels and stations established in 1984
Low-power television stations in the United States
Marion, Ohio
1984 establishments in Ohio